Srinjine is a village in Dalmatia, Croatia, located east of Split, Croatia. The population is 1,201 (census 2011).

References

Populated places in Split-Dalmatia County